Shore Things is a 1996 PBS television documentary by Rick Sebak of WQED Pittsburgh.  The show profiles American beaches, the things they are known for, and other notable facts.

The beaches and other things featured are:
Daytona Beach, Florida — cars allowed on sand
Stephen Leatherman — "Dr. Beach"
Venice, Los Angeles, California — canals; artists
Ocean City, New Jersey — boardwalk; salt water taffy; dry town
Ocean City, Maryland — crabs
Outer Banks — fishing
Punalu'u, Hawai'i —  fishing
Calabash, North Carolina — seafood
Rehoboth Beach, Delaware — gay beach
Cape Cod — horseshoe crabs; Cape Cod National Seashore
Nantucket, Massachusetts — sailing
Lucy the Elephant — Margate City, New Jersey
Ocean Beach, San Diego, California — dog beach
Kailua, Hawaii — a "simple" beach

Bonus Features on the DVD Include
 Kelly's Roast Beef from "Sandwiches That You Will Like"
 Santa Cruz Beach Boardwalk from "Great Old Amusement Parks"
 Ligonier Beech from "Things That Are Still Here"

PBS original programming
American documentary films
Beaches of the United States
Documentary films about the United States